Westwood is a station on the Long Island Rail Road's West Hempstead Branch serving the villages of Malverne and Lynbrook, New York. The station platform is located on Foster Avenue in Malverne, with parking facilities on both the Malverne (Foster Avenue at Motley Street) and Lynbrook (Whitehall Street at Whittier Street) sides of the tracks. It has no station building other than a pair of open shelters, the larger one on the Malverne side of the tracks. It also features a gated at-grade pedestrian crossing, one of only a few stations on the Long Island Rail Road to feature such crossings.

No buses connect to Westwood station, however local suburban taxi cabs do stop there. A basketball court can be found on the Malverne side of the station between the platform and parking lot.

History
Before the establishment of Westwood station, the station itself was the site of a junction of two freight sidings in Lynbrook that existed only in 1924 both of which were abandoned in September of that year. The line was electrified on October 19, 1926 and the station itself was established in September 1929. The small station house had a single platform on the Malverne side, as well as an un-gated pedestrian crossing, and a pedestrian bridge over the tracks which existed only until 1938. By 1955, the station house was gutted, leaving only the roof and the frame, thus transforming it into an open shelter. At some point, an identical open shelter was built on the Lynbrook side of the tracks, which had a separate color scheme from the Malverne shelter until the 21st century.

Platform and track
This station has one four-car-long side platform on the west side of the single track, which was converted into a high-level platform in fall 1973.

Gallery

References

External links

West Hempstead Branch Stations (Unofficial LIRR History Website)
 Station from Google Maps Street View
Platform from Google Maps Street View
The gutted Station House from Google Maps Street View

Valley Stream, New York
Long Island Rail Road stations in Nassau County, New York
Railway stations in the United States opened in 1929